James Charles Grant (October 6, 1918 – July 8, 1970) was a Major League Baseball third baseman who played for three seasons. He played for the Chicago White Sox from 1942 to 1943 and the Cleveland Indians from 1943 to 1944.

External links

1918 births
1970 deaths
Baseball players from Wisconsin
Birmingham Barons players
Burials in Wisconsin
Chicago White Sox players
Cleveland Indians players
Gadsden Pilots players
Grand Forks Chiefs players
Major League Baseball third basemen
Meridian Peps players
Milwaukee Brewers (minor league) players
Minot Mallards players
Raleigh Capitals players
Richmond Colts players
Sacramento Solons players
Selma Cloverleafs players
Sportspeople from Racine, Wisconsin
Sportspeople from the Milwaukee metropolitan area
St. Paul Saints (AA) players